Primary elections were first introduced in Italy by Lega Nord in 1995, but were seldom used until before the 2005 regional elections.

In January 2005 the centre-left The Union coalition held open primaries in order to select its candidate for President in Apulia. More importantly, in October 2005, The Union asked its voters to choose the candidate for Prime Minister in the 2006 general election: 4.3 million voters showed up and Romano Prodi won hands down. Two years later, in October 2007: 3.5 million voters of the Democratic Party were called to elect Walter Veltroni as their first leader, the party's constituent assembly and regional leaders.

The centre-right (see House of Freedoms, The People of Freedom, centre-right coalition and Forza Italia) has held primary elections only at the local level.

Regulatory rules
There are no laws at country level to govern the conduct of any primary election.

In 2004 Tuscany introduced a regional law regulating primaries, but parties are not mandated to hold primaries. As of today, these rules were used in occasion of the 2005 regional election by the Democrats of the Left and Future Tuscany, and in the 2010 regional election by the Democratic Party and Left Ecology Freedom.

List of primary elections
The list includes the results of (open) primary elections for prime minister, president of region, mayor of a city with 150,000 inhabitants and leader of major party. All the following primaries were funded and ran by parties, with the sole exception of those for the Regional Council of Tuscany.

Highlighted rows denote country-level primary elections.
O : Open primary
C: Closed primary

2000s

2010s

2020s

References

Political party leadership elections in Italy
Italy